Chaiya station (SRT Code: CIY) is a first class and main railway station in northern Surat Thani Province, Thailand. It on the State Railway of Thailand (SRT) Southern railway line at km597.751 in Talad Chaiya Town, Chaiya District. It has two tracks in its rail yard, two platforms and has no siding for freight trains.

History
Chaiya Railway Station is the one of the oldest railway stations in Southern Thailand. It was opened in 1915 in an area that was later developed into the current Chaiya town. At that time the main settlement was at Phumriang, but many citizens moved to build houses near the new station, creating a settlement that grew to a new town.

Chaiya Railway Station's appearance was improved with repairs in November 2004. It was upgraded to a 2nd class station in May 2005, and upgraded to a 1st class station on 23 July 2010.

Service
, Chaiya Railway Station serves 20 train stops and four trains pass per day, all of them served by the SRT.
 Diesel rail special express train No. 39 / 40 Bangkok - Surat Thani - Bangkok
 Diesel rail special express train No. 41 / 42 Bangkok - Yala - Bangkok
 Diesel rail special express train No. 43 / 44 Bangkok - Surat Thani - Bangkok
 Express train No. 83 / 84 Bangkok - Trang - Bangkok
 Express train No. 85 / 86 Bangkok - Nakhon Si Thammarat - Bangkok
 Rapid train No. 167 / 168 Bangkok - Kantang - Bangkok
 Rapid train No. 169 / 170 Bangkok - Yala - Bangkok
 Rapid train No. 171 / 172 Bangkok - Sungai Kolok - Bangkok
 Rapid train No. 173 / 174 Bangkok - Nakhon Si Thammarat - Bangkok
 Local train No. 445 / 446 Chumphon - Hat Yai - Chumphon

Transportation
Many lines of minibuses connect the town of Chaiya and the station with other parts of the district and neighbouring districts, such as Chaiya - Bandon, Chaiya - Phunphin, Chaiya - Phumriang, Chaiya - Tha Chana.

Buildings and structures in Surat Thani province
Railway stations in Thailand
Railway stations opened in 1915